The Indianapolis Baptist Temple is an Independent Baptist church based in Indianapolis, Indiana, United States.  The church's building was seized by the U.S. federal government after the church refused to withhold taxes from employees' paychecks for 16 years. The founding pastor of the church, Greg J. Dixon, died in October 2019 aged 87.

References

External links

Churches in Indianapolis
Baptist churches in Indiana
Christian organizations established in 1950
1950 establishments in Indiana
Independent Baptist churches in the United States